Buno may refer to:

People
 Conrad Buno (1613–1671), German copperplate engraver, cartographer and publisher
 Buno Ramnath (fl. 18th century), Hindu philosopher

Places
 Buno-Bonnevaux, France
 Buño, Spain

Other
 Buno (era), in Japan
 Buno (wrestling)
 BuNo, a US military aircraft numbering system
 Buno people